The first use of the term brogue originated in 1463-1529? to refer to an Irish accent by John Skelton. It still generally refers to a Southern Irish accent. Less commonly, it may also refer to any other regional forms of English today, in particular those of American English "Ocracoke Brogue," Scotland or the English West Country. Although historically Scottish accents were referred to as Burrs, due to scottish accents rolling Rs.

Multiple etymologies have been proposed: it may derive from the Irish bróg ("shoe"), the type of shoe traditionally worn by the people of Ireland hence possibly originally meant "the speech of those who call a shoe a 'brogue.' Alternatively it may originate as an Irish-English word.

The word was recorded in the 1500s to refer to an Irish accent by John Skelton. There is also a recording of it in 1689. Multiple etymologies have been proposed: it may derive from the Irish bróg ("shoe"), the type of shoe traditionally worn by the people of Ireland and the Scottish Highlands, and hence possibly originally meant "the speech of those who call a shoe a 'brogue.'" It is debated that the term comes from the Irish word barróg, meaning "a hold (on the tongue)," thus "accent" or "speech impediment."

 A famous false etymology states that the word stems from the supposed perception that the Irish spoke English so peculiarly that it was as if they did so "with a shoe in their mouths."

See also
Language contact
List of English words of Irish origin
Regional accents of English

References 

Irish culture
English phonology
Language varieties and styles